Oxygen difluoride is a chemical compound with the formula . As predicted by VSEPR theory, the molecule adopts a "bent" molecular geometry. It is strong oxidizer and has attracted attention in rocketry for this reason. With a boiling point of -144.75 °C, OF2 is the most volatile (isolable) triatomic compound.

Preparation
Oxygen difluoride was first reported in 1929; it was obtained by the electrolysis of molten potassium fluoride and hydrofluoric acid containing small quantities of water. The modern preparation entails the reaction of fluorine with a dilute aqueous solution of sodium hydroxide, with sodium fluoride as a side-product:

Structure and bonding
Its powerful oxidizing properties are suggested by the oxidation number of +2 for the oxygen atom instead of its normal −2.

Reactions
Above 200 °C,  decomposes to oxygen and fluorine by a radical mechanism.

 reacts with many metals to yield oxides and fluorides.

Oxygen difluoride reacts very slowly with water to form hydrofluoric acid:

It can oxidize sulphur dioxide to sulfur trioxide and elemental fluorine:

However, in the presence of UV radiation, the products are sulfuryl fluoride and pyrosulfuryl fluoride:

Safety

Oxygen difluoride is considered an unsafe gas due to its oxidizing properties.

Popular culture
In Robert L. Forward's science fiction novel Camelot 30K, oxygen difluoride was used as a biochemical solvent by fictional life forms living in the solar system's Kuiper belt. While  would be a solid at 30K, the fictional alien lifeforms were described as endothermic, maintaining elevated body temperatures and liquid  blood by radiothermal heating.

Notes

References

External links
 National Pollutant Inventory - Fluoride and compounds fact sheet
 WebBook page for 
 CDC - NIOSH Pocket Guide to Chemical Hazards

Oxygen compounds
Fluorides
Nonmetal halides
Rocket oxidizers
Oxidizing agents
Chalcohalides